The 1976 Arab League summit was held on October 25 in Cairo, Egypt less than two weeks after the Riyadh summit. The summit had a wider Arab participation and was dedicated to following up on the deteriorating situation in Lebanon. The outcome of the summit was the formation and deployment of an Arab peacekeeping force in Lebanon.

See also 
1976 Arab League summit (Riyadh)

1976 Arab League summit (Cairo)
Arab–Israeli conflict
1976 in Egypt
Diplomatic conferences in Egypt
20th-century diplomatic conferences
Arab League
Arab League
1970s in Cairo
October 1976 events in Africa